Angus McKenzie (born 17 July 1998) is a New Zealand cricketer. He made his List A debut on 5 February 2020, for Otago in the 2019–20 Ford Trophy. He made his first-class debut on 18 March 2021, for Otago in the 2020–21 Plunket Shield season. He made his Twenty20 debut on 12 December 2021, for Otago in the 2021–22 Super Smash.

References

External links
 

1998 births
Living people
New Zealand cricketers
Otago cricketers
Place of birth missing (living people)